The Slovenian Hockey Hall of Fame honors the contributions that individuals have made to the sport of hockey in Slovenia. It has opened in 2007, on the 80th anniversary of ice-hockey in Slovenia and 15th anniversary of Slovenia national ice hockey team, by the Ice Hockey Federation of Slovenia. In November 2012 11 new members were added as class of 2012 and 23 as class of 2008.

Members

2007

Ernest Aljančič sr.
Jože Kovač
Emil Ažman
Erik Krisch
Slavko Ažman
Srdan Kuret
Igor Beribak
Franc Lešnjak
Mustafa Bešić
Dominik Lomovšek
Andrej Brodnik
Matko Medja
Vasilij Cerar
Janez Mlakar
Boris Čebulj
Drago Mlinarec
Matevž Čemažar
Murajica Pajič
Hans Dobida
Silvo Poljanšek
Anton Dremelj
Janko Popovič
Jan Ake Edvinsson
Cveto Pretnar
Stane Eržen
Ludvik Ravnik
René Fasel
Viktor Ravnik
Albin Felc
Andrej Razinger
Eldar Gadžijev
Drago Savič
Tone Gale
Matjaž Sekelj
Jože Gogala
Štefan Seme
Marjan Gorenc
Franc Smolej
Edo Hafner
Marko Smolej
Gorazd Hiti
Rudi Hiti
Roman Smolej
Dragan Stanisavljevič
Bogo Jan
Andrej Stare
Ivo Jan, Sr.
Nebojša Stojakovič
Milko Janežič
Lado Šimnic
Marjan Jelovčan
Zvone Šuvak
Brane Jeršin
Toni Tišlar
Vlado Jug
Viktor Tišlar
Ingac Kovač
Ciril Vister
Rudi Knez
Matjaž Žargi

2008
Božidar Beravs
Tomaž Bratina
Drago Horvat
Peter Klemenc
Sašo Košir
Tomaž Košir
Mirko Lap
Tomaž Lepša
Blaž Lomovšek
Janez Puterle
Joža Razingar
Ivan Ščap
Andrej Vidmar
Franci Žbontar
Roman Iskra
Zoran Rozman
Igor Zaletel
Bogdan Jakopič
Gabrijel Javor
Bojan Kavčič
Miloš Sluga
Andrej Verlič
Zlatko Pavlica

2012
Elvis Bešlagič
Robert Ciglenečki
Dejan Kontrec
Tomaž Vnuk
Bojan Zajc
Nik Zupančič
Luka Žagar
Zoran Pahor
Marko Popovič
Žarko Bundala
Franc Ferjanič

Sources
News on Slovenian national TV Website 
News about class of 2012 
News about class of 2008 

Ice hockey in Slovenia
Ice hockey museums and halls of fame
Awards established in 2007
2007 establishments in Slovenia
Halls of fame in Slovenia